An Accounting Entity is simply an Entity for which accounting records are to be kept.

The main requirements for something to be considered an "accounting entity" are:
 It can own property the value of which can be measured in financial terms
 It can incur debts or liabilities which can also be measured in financial terms
 It can therefore be assigned a value for its net worth or solvency which is the difference between the two

Examples of accounting entities include corporations, clubs, trusts, partnerships and individuals.

References

Accounting
Elaiza 2020